The Nelagoney Formation is a geologic formation in Oklahoma. It preserves fossils.

See also

 List of fossiliferous stratigraphic units in Oklahoma
 Paleontology in Oklahoma

References
 

Geologic formations of Oklahoma